Igoris Kirilovas (Igor Yevgenyevich Kirilov; born 19 August 1971 in Vilnius) is a former Lithuanian football player of Russian ethnic origin.

Honours
Lithuania
Baltic Cup winner: 1991, 1998

External links

References

1971 births
Footballers from Vilnius
Living people
Soviet footballers
Lithuanian footballers
Lithuania international footballers
FK Panerys Vilnius players
1. FC Magdeburg players
Lithuanian expatriate footballers
Expatriate footballers in Germany
FBK Kaunas footballers
FC KAMAZ Naberezhnye Chelny players
Expatriate footballers in Russia
Russian Premier League players
Hapoel Jerusalem F.C. players
Expatriate footballers in Israel
Expatriate footballers in the Faroe Islands
FC Tobol players
Expatriate footballers in Kazakhstan
FC Zhetysu players
FK Kareda Kaunas players
Association football defenders
Association football midfielders
Lithuanian people of Russian descent